Sara Guasch (1918–2005) was a Chilean-born actress who spent much of her career working in Mexico. She appeared in more than seventy films and television programmes. She is also known as Sara Guash.

Selected filmography
 The House of the Fox (1945)
 Love for Sale (1951)
 Canasta uruguaya (1951)
 Passionflower (1952)
 Seven Women (1953)
 Hotel Room (1953)
 The Loving Women (1953)
 The Three Elenas (1954)
 The Hidden One (1956)
 Our Man in Casablanca (1966)

References

Bibliography 
 Bloom, Nicholas Dagen. Adventures Into Mexico: American Tourism Beyond the Border. Rowman & Littlefield, 2006.

External links 
 

1918 births
2005 deaths
Chilean film actresses
Chilean people of Catalan descent
Chilean emigrants to Mexico